2,5-diamino-6-(ribosylamino)-4(3H)-pyrimidinone 5'-phosphate reductase (2,5-diamino-6-ribosylamino-4(3H)-pyrimidinone 5'-phosphate reductase, MjaRED, MJ0671 (gene)) is an enzyme with systematic name 2,5-diamino-6-(5-phospho-D-ribosylamino)pyrimidin-4(3H)-one:NAD(P)+ oxidoreductase. This enzyme catalyses the following chemical reaction

 2,5-diamino-6-(5-phospho-D-ribitylamino)pyrimidin-4(3H)-one + NAD(P)+  2,5-diamino-6-(5-phospho-D-ribosylamino)pyrimidin-4(3H)-one + NAD(P)H + H+

The reaction proceeds in the opposite direction. A step in riboflavin biosynthesis, NADPH and NADH functions equally well as a reductant.

References

External links 
 

EC 1.1.1